Rene Adrian Gonzales (born September 3, 1960) is an American former professional baseball infielder. He played in Major League Baseball (MLB) for the Montreal Expos, Baltimore Orioles, Toronto Blue Jays, California Angels, Cleveland Indians, Texas Rangers, and Colorado Rockies.

External links

Baseball Cube
Baseball Almanac

1960 births
Living people
American expatriate baseball players in Canada
American expatriate baseball players in Mexico
Baltimore Orioles players
Baseball players from Austin, Texas
Broncos de Reynosa players
Calgary Cannons players
California Angels players
Charlotte Knights players
Cleveland Indians players
Colorado Rockies players
Colorado Springs Sky Sox players
Indianapolis Indians players
Las Vegas Stars (baseball) players
Major League Baseball infielders
Memphis Chicks players
Midland Angels players
Montreal Expos players
New Orleans Zephyrs players
Oklahoma City 89ers players
Oklahoma RedHawks players
Rochester Red Wings players
Texas Rangers players
Toronto Blue Jays players
Vancouver Canadians players